The Roman Catholic Archdiocese of Santiago de los Caballeros is a Latin rite Metropolitan Archdiocese in the Dominican Republic.

History 
 Established on 25 September 1953 as the Diocese of Santiago de los Caballeros / Sancti Iacobi Equitum (Latin adjective), on territory split off from Roman Catholic Archdiocese of Santo Domingo
 Lost territories on 1978-01-16 to establish two suffragan daughters, Diocese of Mao–Monte Cristi and Diocese of San Francisco de Macorís
 Promoted on 14 February 1994 as Metropolitan Archdiocese of Santiago de los Caballeros / Sancti Iacobi Equitum (Latin)
 Lost territory again on 1996-12-16 to establish another suffragan daughter, the Diocese of Puerto Plata.

Statistics 
As per 2014, it pastorally served 1,118,000 Catholics (83.7% of 1,336,000 total) on 3,633 km² in 89 parishes and 17 missions with 125 priests (74 diocesan, 51 religious), 132 deacons, 350 lay religious (136 brothers, 214 sisters) and 37 seminarians.

Ecclesiastical province 
The Metropolitan has the following suffragan sees :
 Roman Catholic Diocese of La Vega
 Roman Catholic Diocese of Mao-Monte Cristi
 Roman Catholic Diocese of Puerto Plata 
 Roman Catholic Diocese of San Francisco de Macorís.

Bishops 
(all Roman Rite)

Episcopal ordinaries

Suffragan Bishops of Santiago de los Caballeros  
Apostolic Administrator Octavio Antonio Beras Rojas (1953 – 1956-07-22) while Titular Archbishop of Euchaitæ (1945-05-02 – 1961-12-10) and Coadjutor Archbishop of Santo Domingo (Dominican Republic) (1945-05-02 – 1961-12-10)
 Hugo Eduardo Polanco Brito (1956-07-22 – 1966-03-14)
 Roque Antonio Adames Rodríguez (1966.03.14 – 1992-04-22)
 Auxiliary bishop Jesús María de Jesús Moya (1977-04-13 – 1984-04-20)
 Juan Antonio Flores Santana (1992-07-13 – 1994-02-14 see below)

 Metropolitan Archbishops of Santiago de los Caballeros 
 Juan Antonio Flores Santana (see above'' 1994-02-14 - 2003-07-16)
 Auxiliary bishop Diómedes Espinal de León (2000-04-20 – 2006.05-24)
 Ramón Benito de La Rosa y Carpio (2003-07-16 – 2015-02-23)
 Freddy Antonio de Jesús Bretón Martinez (2015-02-23 – ...)
 Auxiliary bishop Valentin Reynoso Hidalgo, (M.S.C.), (2007-10-22 – ...) Titular Bishop of Mades
 Auxiliary Bishop Carlos Tomás Morel Diplán, (2016-12-14 – ...) Titular Bishop of Capo della Foresta

Auxiliary bishops 
Hugo Eduardo Polanco Brito (1953-1956), appointed Bishop here
Jesús María de Jesús Moya (1977-1984), appointed Bishop of San Francisco de Macorís
Diómedes Espinal de León(2000-2006), appointed Bishop of Mao-Monte Cristi
Valentín Reynoso Hidalgo, M.S.C. (2007-2018)
Carlos Tomás Morel Diplán (2016- )

Other priests of this diocese who became bishops 
Gregorio Nicanor Peña Rodríguez, appointed Bishop of Puerto Plata in 1996
José Amable Durán Tineo, appointed auxiliary bishop of Santo Domingo in 2020

See also 
 List of Catholic dioceses in the Dominican Republic

Notes and references

Sources and external links
 GCatholic - data for all sections
 Official website of the Archdiocese of Santiago de los Caballeros 
 
 Conferencia del Episcopado Dominicano (Bishops' Conference)

Roman Catholic dioceses in the Dominican Republic

Roman Catholic ecclesiastical provinces in the Dominican Republic
Religious organizations established in 1953
Roman Catholic dioceses and prelatures established in the 20th century